Ander Alaña Puerta (born 20 November 1981) is a Spanish former footballer who played as a central defender, currently a manager.

Playing career
Born in Bilbao, Biscay, Basque Country, Alaña graduated from Athletic Bilbao's youth system at Lezama, and made his senior debut with the farm team in 1999–2000, in Tercera División. He was promoted to the reserves in July 2000, going on to compete in three Segunda División B seasons with the side before being released in June 2003.

In the summer of 2003, Alaña joined neighbouring club SD Eibar. He appeared in his first game as a professional on 14 September 2003, starting in a 0–0 home draw against Córdoba CF in the Segunda División.

Alaña scored his first goal in the second tier on 7 February 2004, closing the 1–1 home draw with Recreativo de Huelva. He played 26 matches during the campaign, helping to a tenth-place finish.

After an average of roughly 22 appearances per year (he also missed most of 2005–06 due to injury), Alaña was released by the Armeros on 24 June 2009. He subsequently resumed his career mostly in division three, representing Polideportivo Ejido, Deportivo Alavés, SD Amorebieta and SD Leioa. He also helped the last club win promotion to that level in 2014.

Coaching career
In July 2017, one year after working as a coach with Athletic's youths, Alaña was appointed head coach of their third team Basconia. After a poor season in which they barely escaped relegation, he was replaced in the role by Aritz Solabarrieta but remained with the club, taking charge of the under-15 squad.

Managerial statistics

References

External links

1981 births
Living people
Spanish footballers
Footballers from Bilbao
Association football defenders
Segunda División players
Segunda División B players
Tercera División players
CD Basconia footballers
Bilbao Athletic footballers
Athletic Bilbao footballers
SD Eibar footballers
Polideportivo Ejido footballers
Deportivo Alavés players
SD Amorebieta footballers
SD Leioa players
Spanish football managers
Tercera División managers
CD Basconia managers
Athletic Bilbao non-playing staff
Asti Leku Ikastola alumni